Judge Pryor may refer to:

Doris Pryor (born 1977), judge of the United States Court of Appeals for the Seventh Circuit
Jill A. Pryor (born 1963), judge of the United States Court of Appeals for the Eleventh Circuit
William H. Pryor Jr. (born 1962), judge of the United States Court of Appeals for the Eleventh Circuit